Computer.com was a short-lived dot-com company founded in 1999. After spending half of its $7 million in venture capital on ads during Super Bowl XXXIV, it was sold to Office Depot in 2000. It is significant as a case study for business historians and others interested in the dot-com bubble.

History
Prior to 1999, the domain computer.com was owned by Gary Kremen, who sold it for $500,000. In 1999, Mike Ford and Mike "Zappy" Zapolin founded Computer.com as a general-purpose website to teach people about various aspects of computing. After raising $7 million in venture capital, Computer.com partnered with an advertising agency to create three Super Bowl advertisements six weeks before the game started. Initially, they were dismayed, as due to their late entry, their time slot was located at the end of the game, at the two-minute warning. However, thanks to the closely contested game, the advertisement became one of the highest-rated of all time.

After Super Bowl XXXIV, the company secured "an additional $2 million in a second round of funding." In late 2000, the company was sold to Office Depot.

Operation
It is unclear whether Computer.com ever turned a profit or delivered any kind of actual service to consumers.

See also
Dot-com commercials during Super Bowl XXXIV
List of commercials during Super Bowl XXXIV
Dot-com bubble

Domain Usage
As of 2023 the domain is currently being used as a front end for a supposedly modified version of ChatGPT that can search the internet similarly to Bing Chat.

Notes

References

American companies established in 1999
American companies disestablished in 2000
Computer companies established in 1999
Computer companies disestablished in 2000
Defunct computer companies of the United States
Dot-com bubble